Raja Faradj Al-Shalawi (born 19 February 1946) is a Saudi Arabian long-distance runner. He competed in the men's 10,000 metres at the 1976 Summer Olympics.

References

1946 births
Living people
Athletes (track and field) at the 1976 Summer Olympics
Saudi Arabian male long-distance runners
Olympic athletes of Saudi Arabia
Place of birth missing (living people)